Alexey Andreevich Lyapunov (25 September 1911 – 23 June 1973) was a Soviet mathematician and an early pioneer of computer science. One of the founders of Soviet cybernetics, Lyapunov was member of the Soviet Academy of Sciences and a specialist in the fields of real  function theory, mathematical problems of cybernetics, set theory, programming theory, mathematical linguistics, and mathematical biology.

Biography

Composer Sergei Lyapunov, mathematician Aleksandr Lyapunov, and philologist Boris Lyapunov were close relatives of Alexey Lyapunov.

In 1928, Lyapunov enrolled at Moscow State University to study mathematics, and in 1932 he became a student of Nikolai Luzin. Under his mentorship, Lyapunov began his research in descriptive set theory. He became world-wide known for his theorem on the range of an atomless vector-measure in finite dimensions, now called the Lyapunov Convexity Theorem.

From 1934 until the early 1950s, Lyapunov was on the staff of the Steklov Institute of Mathematics. When Mstislav Keldysh organized the Department of Applied Mathematics (now the M.V. Keldysh Institute of Applied Mathematics) he suggested Lyapunov to lead its work on programming.

In 1954 A.A. Lyapunov was invited by A.I. Kitov (scientific director of the Computing Center No. 1 of the USSR Ministry of Defense) to this computing center as head of the laboratory. A.A. Lyapunov worked at this military computing center until 1960.

In 1961, Lyapunov moved to the Institute of Mathematics of the Siberian Division of the USSR Academy of Sciences (now the Sobolev Institute of Mathematics), where he founded the department of cybernetics. At Novosibirsk State University, he founded the Department of Theoretical Cybernetics and the Laboratory of Cybernetics at the Institute of Hydrodynamics of the Siberian Division of the USSR Academy of Sciences (now the Lavrentiev Institute of Hydrodynamics) which he led until the end of his life.

In 1964, Lyapunov was elected a member of the USSR Academy of Sciences and joined the Division of Mathematics.

He was awarded the Order of Lenin. In 1996, he was awarded the IEEE Computer Society's Computer Pioneer Award.

References
 Biography of Lyapunov
 Lyapunov's contributions to cybernetics
 Lyapunov's 90th birthday
 Lyapunov at IPM RAS

External links
 
 A. A. Lyapunov (on his 60th birthday)
 S. Kutateladze "Lyapunov's convexity theorem, zonoids, and bang-bang"

Soviet mathematicians
1911 births
1973 deaths
Academic staff of Novosibirsk State University
Soviet cyberneticists
Alexey
Moscow State University alumni
Scientists from Moscow